Elham Malekpoor Arashlu or Elham Malepoor is an Iranian poet, writer and journalist. She was born in Iran and she is semi-blind.

Biography

Elham was born in July 1983 in Iran. She graduated from Kerman University in Persian literature. She lives in the Netherlands and works as an LGBT Rights activist, writer, and poet.

Elham left Iran in September 2012 due to threats against her. She has been a member of PEN International in the Netherlands since 2016. Elham worked in JoopeA Foundation as a member of management team from 2015 to 2018.

Books

Elham published her first book of poems Jamaica is a country too... in 2006 in Iran.

Malekpoor is also the author of the books A chair to sit, Historiography of Homan and Breaking the invertebrate flesh.

References

External links
Personal website 

1983 births
Iranian journalists
Iranian human rights activists
Iranian women's rights activists
Living people
Iranian LGBT rights activists
Iranian LGBT poets
Iranian women poets
Women civil rights activists